The Highliners is a British rock and roll / psychobilly band known for the hit singles “Henry The Wasp” and “The Benny Hill Boogie”, antics include dressing in pink doctor martens boots, black capes and driving a pink van with a skeleton surfing on the roof.

Formed in London in 1984 by Luke Morgan and Chris Finch who met at the Central School of Art and Design. The name The Highliners came from the Mk2 Ford Consuls and Zephyrs they owned. In 1985 Luke Morgan, Chris Finch, Kev “Stretch” Feeney and drummer Tim Potter took a pink split screen VW bus to France for a 3-month tour of the Riviera.

In 1986 several drummers later Roy Williams of Nervous Records introduced Ginger Meadham from The Meteors, Ricochets and Guana Batz and by 1987 this four piece had a TV residency on the channel 4 show Comedy Wave Length with Paul Merton and Josie Lawrence

They were joined by Ben Blakeman of The Cocteau Twins on lead guitar and regularly topped the bill at John Curd’s legendary psychobilly club, the “Klub Foot” in Hammersmith where the pink van became a landmark.
Here they were recorded live on Saturday 16th Jan 1988 for the album “Stomping at The Klub Foot 5” released in March 1988.

Their final head line show at the Klub Foot on Sunday 26 June 1988 formed part of the 13 night farewell to the club known as "The Final Curtain" before The Clarendon Hotel Ballroom was demolished.
This 5 piece had UK chart successes with “Double shot of my baby's love” reaching No. 15 (NME Independent charts 3rd Sept 1988)  “Henry The Wasp” on the Radio One and Radio Two play-lists and  “The Benny Hill Boogie” that immortalized Jenny Lee-Wright “The Sexiest Stooge”. These hits were featured in a Radio One interview with Luke Morgan and the first album “Bound for Glory” was released in 1989 on Razor Records.

Rick Buckler from The Jam then replaced Ginger on drums having earlier worked with Mike Spencer on the final mix and production of the album, Rick Buckler toured the UK and Europe with them in 1990 and is still involved with the band today. Fanzines include artwork by Luke Morgan, Chris Finch and Vaun Richards of The Funday Times.

In 2010 Ginger rejoined for his first gig with the band for over 20 years at the 2010 Pineda De Mar Psychobilly Meeting in Spain.

Luke Morgan, lead vocals and Ginger Meadham on drums have been joined by Mad Andy Kandil on guitar and Ricky Lee Sardi on bass as they continue to tour and record.

Discography 
 Studio Demo 4 tracks on cassette only 1986
 Double Shot (ABC) 7” single 1988
 Henry the Wasp (ABC) 7” single 1988
 Henry the Wasp (ABC) 12” single 1988
 Stomping at The Klub Foot 5 (ABC) Compilation Album 1988
 The Benny Hill Boogie (Razor Records) 7” single 1989
 Bound For Glory (Razor Records) Album 1989
 ABC/ID The Psychobilly Singles Collection
 Psychomania Vol. 3 (DoJo) Compilation Album 1995
 Fetish Party (Nervous) 10” EP 1998
 Spank‘O’Matic (JPB) Album 2000
 Gravedigger Stomp EP 2013
 The Diablo Session LP 2014

References

 Sounds (UK Music press) 25th Oct 1986
 File:Melody Maker (UK Music press) 22nd Nov 1986
 The Sun newspaper 26th Jan 1987
 Scooter Scene magazine 1988
 NME magazine indi charts10th Sept 1988
 Music Week magazine 22 Oct 1988
 Street Machine magazine Nov 1988

External links
 The Highliners on Myspace
 http://www.discogs.com/Highliners-Henry-The-Wasp/release/1560625
http://www.imdb.com/name/nm0496751/bio

http://www.discogs.com/Highliners-The-Benny-Hill-Boogie/master/265795

British psychobilly musical groups
Musical groups from London
Musical groups established in 1984